The F. M. Dostoyevsky Literary Memorial Museum (Государственный Литературно-мемориальный музей Ф. М. Достоевского), located on Kuznechny Lane 5/2 in Saint Petersburg, was opened on November 12, 1971 in the former apartment of the Russian writer Fyodor Dostoyevsky.

Dostoyevsky lived in the apartment twice during his life: first for a short period in 1846 in the beginnings of his career, and later from October 1878 until his death in January 1881. The apartment was his home during the composition of some of his most notable works, including The Double: A Petersburg Poem (1846) and The Brothers Karamazov (1879–1880). The apartment has been reconstructed based on the memoirs of the writer's second wife, Anna Dostoyevskaya, and his friends.

Museum features
The Dostoyevsky Museum has several parts:

 The "Writer’s Memorial Apartment" – the museum's central part
 The "Literary Exhibit", dedicated to the writer's biography and works.
 The exhibit halls, for exhibits of contemporary art
 The theater, in which the White Theater presents its performances, as well as the museum's partner theaters: "Puppet Format", "Takoy Theatre", and other local, national, and international theaters.

Over the years, the museum's collection has increased many times over. It currently includes a large collection of graphic and applied art and a significant collection of photographs.

The museum library holds about 24,000 volumes and a small collection of manuscripts. The collection has continued growing due to gifts from visitors, friends of the museum, and Dostoevsky scholars.

Every November, the museum hosts an international scholarly conference, Dostoyevsky and World Culture, and a journal of the same name is published with the conference proceedings.

The museum is included in cultural tours in Saint Petersburg, some specifically focusing upon Dostoevsky.

See also
 List of museums in Saint Petersburg

References

External links

F.M. Dostoevsky Literary and Memorial Museum at russianmuseums.info

Museums established in 1971
Fyodor Dostoyevsky
Literary museums in Saint Petersburg
Biographical museums in Saint Petersburg
Cultural heritage monuments of federal significance in Saint Petersburg